= Antiphospholipid syndrome, familial =

Genetic element in the species Homo sapiens

ATPLS

Identifiers
- Aliases: antiphospholipid syndromefamilial
- External IDs: GeneCards: ; OMA:- orthologs
Orthologs
Species	Human	Mouse
Entrez	100499532	n/a
Ensembl	n/a	n/a
UniProt	n a	n/a
RefSeq (mRNA)	n/a	n/a
RefSeq (protein)	n/a	n/a
Location (UCSC)	n/a	n/a
PubMed search		n/a
- Wikidata
View/Edit Human

Antiphospholipid syndrome, familial is a protein that in humans is encoded by the ATPLS gene.
